Tourville-la-Rivière is a commune in the Seine-Maritime department in the Normandy region in northern France.

Geography
Junction 21 of the A13 autoroute is within the commune's borders. SNCF operates a TER rail service to the town. A huge new shopping centre was opened here in 2006.

Heraldry

Population

Places of interest
 The shopping centre.
 The church of St. Martin, dating from the sixteenth century.
 The seventeenth-century chateau of Tourville at Bédane, with a dovecote built in 1691 and a 15th-century chapel.
 A seventeenth-century stone cross.
 A Roman necropolis of 150 to 200 tombs with pottery and coins all discovered during the building of the SNCF railway.

See also
Communes of the Seine-Maritime department

References

External links

The shopping centre website 
Official town website 

Communes of Seine-Maritime